Neuenkirchen is a Samtgemeinde ("collective municipality") in the district of Osnabrück, in Lower Saxony, Germany. Its seat is in the village Neuenkirchen.

The Samtgemeinde Neuenkirchen consists of the following municipalities:
 Merzen 
 Neuenkirchen 
 Voltlage 

Samtgemeinden in Lower Saxony